Antonina, or the Fall of Rome is an 1850 novel by Wilkie Collins.

References

1850 British novels